RTPS may refer to:

 Real Time Publish Subscribe protocol, a Data Distribution Service (DDS) protocol for computer systems
 Radiation Treatment Planning System